The .338 Federal is a rifle cartridge based on the .308 Winchester case necked up to .33 caliber. It was created by Federal Cartridge and Sako in 2006 and intended as a big game cartridge with reasonable recoil for lightweight rifles.

Comparison
The .338 Federal was designed by Federal Ammunition and it is a SAAMI standardized cartridge that was released in 2006. In the table below is a comparison between the .338 Federal and the older .358 Winchester, another cartridge based on the .308 Winchester.

See also
 .338 Lapua Magnum
 .338 Marlin Express
 .338 Ruger Compact Magnum
 .338 Remington Ultra Magnum
 .338 Winchester Magnum
 8 mm caliber
 List of rifle cartridges
 Table of handgun and rifle cartridges
 sectional density

Notes

References

External links
 Peterson's Rifle Shooter magazine reviewed the .338 Federal in a Kimber 84M in "Truly Useful: The .338 Federal."
 Chub Eastman of Guns & Ammo has an article on reloading the .338 Federal: ".338 Federal: Federal's first proprietary cartridge makes real short-action sense"  (2 Feb. 2007). He also wrote of using it to hunt antelope in New Mexico.
 Chuck Hawks reviewed the .338 Federal in, "First Look: The .338 Federal Rifle Cartridge"
 Sheriff Jim Wilson of Shooting Times magazine reviewed the .338 Federal in a Sako rifle and tells of his experience hunting whitetail deer with them "In The Field With The New .338 Federal".
 Buck Pope of GunWeek reviewed using the .338 Federal in a Sako Hunter Model 85 and his use of them to harvest a 225-pound wild boar and an 8-point whitetail deer "The New .338 Federal Is Big News for Big Game"
 Buck Pope of GunWeek reviewed the .338 Federal in a Ruger Model 77 Mark II Frontier in "Ruger M77 Frontier Rifle In .338 Federal Test Report"
 Jeff Quinn of GunBlast.com reviewed the ArmaLite AR-10T in .338 Federal in "ArmaLite AR-10(T) Match Grade .338 Federal Semi-Auto Rifle" (14 Aug 2008).

Pistol and rifle cartridges